is the 10th single by Japanese singer/songwriter Chisato Moritaka. Written by Moritaka and Hideo Saitō, the single was released by Warner Pioneer on May 25, 1990. Known for its unique rockabilly tune, the song was used in a Pioneer cordless phone commercial featuring Moritaka.

The music video LaserDisc was released on March 25, 1991, with its contents compiled in the 2000 DVD Chisato Moritaka DVD Collection No. 6: Kusai Mono ni wa Futa wo Shiro!!/Rock Alive.

Chart performance 
"Kusai Mono ni wa Futa wo Shiro!!" peaked at No. 4 on Oricon's singles chart and sold 117,000 copies.

Other versions 
Two remixes of "Kusai Mono ni wa Futa wo Shiro!!" and one remix of "Nozokanai de" are included in Moritaka's 1991 remix album The Moritaka.

Moritaka re-recorded the song and uploaded the video on her YouTube channel on her birthday on April 11, 2014. This version is also included in Moritaka's 2015 self-covers DVD album Love Vol. 7.

Track listing 
All lyrics are written by Chisato Moritaka; all music is composed and arranged by Hideo Saitō, except where indicated.

Personnel 
 Chisato Moritaka – vocals
 Hideo Saitō – all instruments, programming, backing vocals

Chart positions

References

External links 
  (Single)
  (Video)
 
 

1990 singles
1990 songs
1991 video albums
Japanese-language songs
Chisato Moritaka songs
Songs with lyrics by Chisato Moritaka
Songs with music by Hideo Saitō (musician, born 1958)
Warner Music Japan singles